Ctenolepis garcini, also known as Garcin's bur cucumber, is a tender climber of the family Cucurbitaceae. It is one of the three species of the genus Ctenolepis. It is widely distributed in southern India and Ceylon. The species was named after French botanist Laurent Garcin, who traveled India in the 18th century.

Description

It is a climbing vine with three to five lobed palmate leaves. Large stipule-like bracts with cilliate margins are found on the axils of the leaves and fruits. It is a monoecious plant with male flowers in raceme inflorescences and female flowers solitary. Fruits are borne in the months of December to January. Fruit is sub-reniform, glabrous, possessing one to two oblong seeds. Leaves span 1 to 4 cm in length.

References

Cucurbitoideae